Zar Vaqt (also Romanized as Zar Vaqt; also known as Zarvaqt) is a village in Kuhpayeh Rural District Rural District, in the Central District of Bardaskan County, Razavi Khorasan Province, Iran. At the 2006 census, its population was 159, in 53 families.

References 

Populated places in Bardaskan County